Francis Charles Hill (5 March 1914 – 12 December 1976) was an Australian rules footballer who played with South Melbourne in the Victorian Football League (VFL).

Family
The son of Francis Charles Hill, and Daisy Jane Hill, née Dean, Francis Charles Hill was born at Myrtleford, Victoria on 5 March 1914.

He married Adeline Mavis Garoni in 1942.

Death
He died at Shallow Inlet, Victoria, on 12 December 1976.

Notes

References
 
 World War Two Nominal Roll: Flight Sergeant Francis Charles Hill (4837), Department of Veterans' Affairs.

External links 

1914 births
1976 deaths
Australian rules footballers from Victoria (Australia)
Sydney Swans players